Stepping or step-dancing (a type of step dance) is a form of percussive dance in African-American culture. The participant's entire body is used as an instrument to produce complex rhythms and sounds through a mixture of footsteps, spoken word, and hand claps. Though stepping may be performed by an individual, it is generally performed by groups of three or more, often in arrangements that resemble military formations.

Stepping may also draw from elements of gymnastics, break dance, tap dance, march, or African and Caribbean dance, or include stunts as a part of individual routines. The speed of the step depends upon the desired beat and rhythm of the performers. Some forms of stepping include the use of props, such as canes, rhythm sticks and/or fire and blindfolds.

The tradition of stepping is rooted within the competitive schoolyard song and dance rituals practiced by historically African American fraternities and sororities, beginning in the 1900s.

Stepping
Stepping finds its origins in a combination of military close-order and exhibition drill. It also originally drew heavily from the stage routines and movements of popular R&B groups such as The Temptations and The Four Tops. During the mid-20th century, historically black fraternities and sororities on United States college campuses traditionally sang and chanted to celebrate "crossing over" into membership of their respective organizations. Stepping is also performed by schools, churches, cheerleading squads, and drill teams.

History
Stepping gained its distinctive percussive style after the 1739 Stono Rebellion in South Carolina. There, 20 enslaved people organized a rebellion near the banks of Stono River, banging on drums as they marched down the streets. The noise attracted a larger crowd of enslaved people who joined the revolution, and also of white colonists who killed most of the rebels. In the aftermath, lawmakers outlawed drumming as well as the right to own one, in order to eliminate it as a source of communication between enslaved persons. Following the ban, the percussive dance form (known today as stepping) began to emerge as enslaved people replaced the drums with their bodies.

In the early 1900s, the inception of black Greek organizations changed stepping into the style that many recognize today. NPHC fraternities and sororities had "Greek Sings," and this tradition gradually came to be used to celebrate initiations into the world of Greeks. The chapters would gather on campus and sing uplifting songs and cheers about their fraternity or sorority. In later years when the Greeks sung songs, they added movements such as walking in a circle and clapping hands. The sororities were singing songs up to the early eighties, and all of the sororities still have traditional songs that they sing today. Meanwhile, the fraternities began to add movement to their songs. In later years "Greek Sings" became "Greek Shows" which were a major event and still are to this day. The first official Greek Show was held at Howard University in 1976. Stepping has been popularized by National Pan-Hellenic Council member organizations who give tributes to their historical Greek letter organizations and also perform at local and national competitions. Stepping has become popular among the Greek organizations to show spirit and pride in their fraternity or sorority.

The most popular step routines have been passed down, and many of the songs are still used and housed in each fraternity's and sorority's history archives. Many times a step performance ends or incorporates the use of a chant that is associated with the respective organization. A chant is a song that is worded or has a rhythm specific to that organization. Each particular organization has their own.

Over time, more and more organizations have created moves to continue this growing passion; however, certain steps and moves originated and are considered signature to particular organizations. For example, "The Nut Cracker" is unique to Phi Beta Sigma fraternity, "The Dove" is unique to Zeta Phi Beta sorority, "the Q Hop" is originally from Omega Psi Phi fraternity, "The Alpha Train" is a staple of Alpha Phi Alpha, and "The Poodle Prance" is a signature move of Sigma Gamma Rho sorority.

In 2019, stepping advanced its movements with the creation of the World of Step, which is an international community focused on embracing the inclusivity of step step as defined as using your body as an instrument to create sound. Once established, it opened its doors in connecting Haka, Zapateo Peruano, Taino Culture, Irish Step Dance and much more. Now it serves as the largest competition in the world with operations in United States, Senegal and Belgium along with participation of over 1 million votes.

With the push of step becoming inclusive in the dance world, the copyright office has an official language of step called: Remo System, created under the company Art of Stepping which teaches step through a written language. In addition, in 2019 the 1st ever step mobile app to help support the language of step was launched on Android app.

Contests
The first nationally syndicated stepping contest, S.T.O.M.P., aired in 1992 was created by Frank Mercardo Valdes, produced by the World African Network and Vic Bulluck and choreographed by Vernon Jackson and Jimmy Hamilton of Alpha Phi Alpha fraternity. Again they were also known as Step by Step Stomp aired 1992-1996.

World of Step International Competition, serves as the largest competition for step that includes the following countries: USA, Spain, Peru, Senegal, Korea, Kenya, Canada, Belgium with expansion in Italy and Ireland which was created by Jessica 'REMO' Saul, Founder of Art of Stepping and member of Omega Phi Beta sorority.

Stepping influence in other cultures
Stepping is a complex performance that melds folk traditions with popular culture and involves synchronized percussive movement, singing, speaking, chanting, and drama. Developed by African American fraternities and sororities, it is now practiced worldwide.
For example, the tradition has been emulated by Latino fraternities and sororities such as Lambda Sigma Upsilon fraternity and Omega Phi Beta sorority which was lead and created by Jessica 'REMO' Saul, Founder of Art of Stepping, World of Step and World of Step Media. This has led to an increase in participation of Latino Greek organizations in step show events, with groups often adding influences from Salsa, Merengue, Bachata, as well as other traditionally Latino music. Latino Greeks are performing in more step shows, stroll competitions, and social functions on college campuses throughout the United States. Stepping has also been emulated by white, Multicultural, and Asian fraternities and sororities.

See also 
Drill team
Get down
Gumboot dance
Stomp the Yard
NALFO
National Pan-Hellenic Council 
Step dance
Showtime Steppers
Dance in the United States

References

Bibliography
Brown, Jamie. "Black Fraternities and Sororities and the History of Stepping." Yahoo! Contributor Network. Yahoo! Contributor Network, 10 Jan. 2008. Web. 3 May 2013
 
Malone, Jacqui. Steppin on the Blues. Chicago: University of Illinois Press, 1996.
Ross, Lawrence Jr. The Divine Nine - The History of African American Fraternities and Sororities. Kensington Publishing Corporation, 2001.

Tap dance
African-American dance
National Pan-Hellenic Council
Uses of shoes
African-American cultural history